Hello Pratibha (International Title: Hello Pratiba) is an Indian television drama show, which premiered on 27 January 2015 till 27 July 2015. It aired Monday to Saturday on Zee TV. The series is dubbed in English and airs on Zee World from Friday 22 September 2017 on weekdays.

Plot
A woman who forgets her personal interests, goals, and talents while fulfilling the responsibilities of a wife, mother, and daughter-in-law and how she eventually tries to discover herself after 16 years of marriage is the story of Zee TV's forthcoming show "Hello Pratibha", which was launched here with much fanfare.

Pratibha was filled with hope, ambition, and talent of her own, and is now married for 16 years and has devoted her entire life to her husband, kids, and in-laws, thereby facing an identity crisis.

The drama starts off with everyone thinking of Prathiba has a woman meant for the kitchen and nothing else. Her husband doesn't seem interested in her. Her kids look up to the wife of her husband's brother. Her mother is law is never happy with her. She bears all this with a quiet voice. Later she has the courage to speak up and wins everyone heart.

Cast
 Binny Sharma as Pratibha Mahendra Agarwal
 Sachal Tyagi as Mahendra Agarwal
 Snigdha Pandey as Sunidhi Agarwal 
 Garima Jain as Namrata Agarwal
 Shazil khan as Anmol Mahendra Agarwal
 Ridhi as Pihu Agarwal
 Sangeeta Panwar as Kashi Agarwal
 Tarul Swami as Sanjeev Agarwal
 Jinal Jain as Shalu Khaana
 Sheeba Chaddha as Pushpa Chachi
 Srishty Rode as Naina
 Stacy Gloria as Roshni

References

External links
 
 

Zee TV original programming
2015 Indian television series debuts
2015 Indian television series endings